Florentin Antinoüs Numa Auguez (31 January 1847 in Saleux (Somme) – 27 January 1903) in Paris, was a 19th-century French baritone and singing teacher at the Conservatoire de Paris.

Biography 
After two years of commercial employment in the capital, Numa Auguez was admitted to the Paris Conservatoire in 1867, where he obtained a first runner-up in the opera competition and a second one in July 1869. His stage debut was abruptly interrupted by the declaration of war in 1870, when he enlisted and distinguished himself in the battle of Epernay. After the war, he resumed classes at the Conservatoire for an additional year before being hired at the Paris Opera.

For nine years from 1873 to 1882, he was part of the Palais Garnier troupe. He then left Paris to perform in Rome in Italy and in Antwerp in Belgium between 1883 and 1884. On his return to France, he was engaged by the Colonne, Harcourt and Lamoureux concerts as well as by the Conservatoire where he obtained his greatest successes.

Widower of Blanche Bourgeat, he married Marie-Berthe de Montalant (1865–1937) in February 1893, a lyrical artist and singing teacher who would now perform under the name of Berthe Auguez de Montalant.

Numa Auguez left the operatic scenes in 1899 and devoted himself to teaching singing at the Conservatory and the École Niedermeyer de Paris.

Numa Auguez died at the age of 55 as a result of a long illness. He is buried in his native village after a funeral in the Saint-Augustin church in Paris.

Distinctions 
 Military Medal as a Volunteer War Veteran of 1870–1871

Sources 
 Le nouvel Opéra : le monument, les artistes by X.Y.Z., Paris, Michel Lévy frères, 1875
 Dictionnaire du monde artistique
 La Gazette artistique littéraire et illustrée n° 6 (1898)
 , 29 January 1903

References 

1847 births
People from Somme (department)
1903 deaths
French operatic baritones
Academic staff of the Conservatoire de Paris
19th-century French male musicians